Hemitaurichthys is a genus of marine ray-finned fish, butterflyfishes from the family Chaetodontidae. They are native to the Indian and Pacific oceans.

The name of this genus is a compound of the Greek hemi meaning “half” and in this case meaning “similar to“, taurus meaning “bull” and ichthys meaning “fish”, taurichthys being a synonym of Heniochus and refers to the bony protuberances, similar to horns, on the head of Heniochus varius.

Species
There are currently four recognized species in this genus:
 Hemitaurichthys multispinosus J. E. Randall, 1975 (many-spined butterflyfish)
 Hemitaurichthys polylepis (Bleeker, 1857) (pyramid butterflyfish)
 Hemitaurichthys thompsoni Fowler, 1923 (Thompson's butterflyfish)
 Hemitaurichthys zoster (E. T. Bennett, 1831) (brown-and-white butterflyfish)

References

Chaetodontidae
Marine fish genera
Taxa named by Pieter Bleeker